Sanna Lehtimäki (born 16 November 1975) is a Finnish former racing cyclist. She won the Finnish national road race title in 1998 and 1999.

References

External links
 

1975 births
Living people
Finnish female cyclists
People from Ylöjärvi
Sportspeople from Pirkanmaa